Adolf Hoffmeister (15 August 1902 – 24 July 1973) was a Czechoslovak illustrator, caricaturist, painter, writer, poet, journalist, politician, diplomat and traveler.

Life and career

Early life 
He was born in Prague, to the family of a Prague lawyer. He grew up in a cultivated intellectual environment, his uncle was the composer and educator Karel Hoffmeister.

In the years 1912–1921, he studied at the Real Gymnasium school in Křemencova Street in Prague, where most of the future members of the avant-garde group Devětsil met. When Devětsil was founded on October 5, 1920, Adolf Hoffmeister became its youngest member and at the same time an executive. After graduating, he continued his studies at the Faculty of Law of Charles University in Prague, which he completed in 1925 by obtaining a doctorate. In the summer semester of 1924 he studied Egyptology at the University of Cambridge.

From 1917 he started writing poems, which he first published in magazines under various pseudonyms, he devoted himself to drawing and linocut. In 1922 he published the first book of poems and prose, participated in seventeen works at the spring exhibition Devětsil and in the same year traveled to Paris. He met artists such as Man Ray and Ossip Zadkin. He left the group Devětsil and joined a group of artists named the "New Group". In the following period, he devoted himself to caricatures, which he sent to Lidové noviny.

Inter-war career 
After graduating from law school, he regularly traveled abroad and worked as a correspondent for many magazines. After graduating from law school, he regularly traveled abroad and worked as a correspondent for many magazines. In addition to information about cultural events, he also sent his own drawing portraits of personalities with whom he met in person. In 1926 he published the novel The Tropic of Capricorn and a collection of poems The Alphabet of Love. He also was the editor of the Pestrý týden magazine.

In 1927 he had his first solo exhibition in the Odeon exhibition hall. In April 1927, the poet Vladimir Mayakovsky lived with him during his stay in Prague. Together with Nezval, he accompanied the French poet Philippe Soupault and publisher Léon Pierre-Quint in Prague. Miroslava Holzbachová performed Hoffmeister's ballet Park to the music of Jaroslav Ježek in Umělecká beseda and his comedy premiered at the Osvobozené divadlo, The bride directed by Jindřich Honzl. The photographer of the performance was Jaroslav Rössler. Hoffmeister's permanent collaboration with Voskovec, Werich and Ježek began, for which he prepared programs and posters and drew numerous caricatures.

In 1928 he had his first solo exhibition in Paris (Visages par Adolf Hoffmeister) at the Galerie d'Art Contemporain and a rerun of this exhibition at the Galerie l'Epoque in Brussels. The successful exhibition opened the possibility for him to cooperate with the foreign press, especially with the newspaper L'Intransigeant. He became a member of the committee of the PEN club in Prague.

From 1929 he was a member of the progressive organization of Czech intellectuals, the Left Front.

In 1930, the publisher Otakar Storch-Marien sent him on trips around Europe to interview important personalities of European culture and illustrate them with his caricatures. Hoffmeister met with Tristan Tzara, James Joyce, Le Corbusier André Gide, Paul Valéry, Georg Grosz, G.K. Chsterton etc. The book of interviews Write As You Hear was published in 1931.

He became one of the artists of the so-called Mánes Union of Fine Arts, when they were offered full artistic freedom. H e traveled with Bedřich Feuerstein to the Soviet Union and met many cultural figures such as Anatoly Lunacharsky, Akexander Tairov, Ervin Piscator, Hannes Meyer and on his way back in Leningrad with George Bernard Shaw and Aldous Huxley.

Having been in the 30s in Germany and working with the satirical magazine Simplicissimus, the Nazis turned the line of the magazine in to an entertainment magazine. Hoffmeister participated in the publishing of the anti-fascist weekly "Simplicus", then "Simpl" in Prague, together with German emigrants such as John Heartfield. He traveled to Spain while the Civil War was about to accur and became a member of the Committee of Aid for Democratic Spain.

He participated in the congress of the PEN club in Prague and the activities of the Association of Czechoslovak Writers.

At the beginning of 1939, his caricatures were exhibited in Topič's salon at the posthumous exhibition of Karel Čapek and at the exhibition of portraits of members of SVU Mánes.

World War II and emigration 
Two days after the occupation of Czechoslovakia by German troops and the proclamation of the Protectorate, Hoffmeister received an invitation to France on March 18, 1939, which was arranged by Louis Aragon. He received an extraordinary French visa and fled to Paris on April 23.

There he established contacts with resistance organizations and with the help of the French communists founded the Maison de la Culture Tchécoslovaque. In September 1939, after the occupation of eastern Poland by Soviet troops, he was arrested and charged on the basis of anonymous allegations together with many other citizens of Czechoslovakia as an agent of Moscow.

In January 1941, with the help of Jan Werich and Jiří Voskovec, he crossed Havana to New York. He shortly traveled to Hollywood but then returned to New York.

In 1943 he took part in the Art in Exile exhibition at the New York Public Library and, together with Antonín Pelc, had an exhibition of political cartoons at the Museum of Modern Art, which was opened by Edvard Beneš.

Return to Czechoslovakia 
In June 1945, he was invited by the Minister of Information Václav Kopecký to return to Czechoslovakia. Hoffmeister joined the Communist Party and in November 1945 became the head of 6th Department of the Ministry of Information and Education, where he was in charge of foreign cultural relations. He held this position until March 1948.

As a member of the Czechoslovak delegation, he participated in the First General Assembly of UNESCO and participated in the preparation of the exhibition Art tchécoslovaque 1938–1946 in Paris. The French government awarded him the Order of the Legion of Honor.

In February 1948, he became chairman of the action committee of the Union of Czechoslovak Artists. In March, he led a Czechoslovak delegation to an international conference on freedom of information in Geneva. He received an offer from the Ministry of Foreign Affairs to enter the diplomatic service and in June he was appointed Czechoslovak ambassador to Paris.

In 1955 he was sent to Beijing and Shanghai as the commissioner of the cultural part of the exhibition Ten Years of Building Czechoslovakia and included his experiences in the 2nd edition of the book Postcards from China. In the book One Hundred Years of Czech Caricature, he was the first art historian to write the history of this genre.

On May 1, 1960, Adolf Hoffmeister was awarded the Order of the Republic. He was involved in favor of the imprisoned Laco Novomeský, who was charged with bourgeois nationalism but received an amnesty in 1960.

Later life 
After the crushing of the Prague Spring, he left his home again for two years and was a professor at the Université de Vincennes (University of Paris 8 Vincennes-Saint-Denis), but in 1970 he returned to Prague. In 1970–1972 he was active again as a professor at the Academy of Arts, Architecture and Design in Prague in Prague. In 1970, He was summoned for inspection at the Central Committee of the Communist Party and subsequently expelled from the Communist Party and from all public, publishing and exhibition activities. During the period of normalization, he was disqualified as a non-person and as a "Salon Communist". Adolf Hoffmeister died of a heart attack on July 24, 1973 in his cottage at Říčky.

References

1902 births
1973 deaths
People from Prague
Czech painters
Czech illustrators
20th-century Czech painters
Czech poets
Czech caricaturists
20th-century Czech poets
20th-century Czech dramatists and playwrights
20th-century Czech writers
Czech cartoonists
20th-century Czech novelists
20th-century Czech male artists
Czech male dramatists and playwrights
Czech diplomats
Communist Party of Czechoslovakia politicians
Communist Party of Czechoslovakia members
Ambassadors of Czechoslovakia to France
Chevaliers of the Ordre des Arts et des Lettres
Academic staff of the Academy of Arts, Architecture and Design in Prague